Jason Cord Buckel (born November 3, 1971) is an American politician, and the minority leader in the Maryland House of Delegates. He has represented District 1B since 2015. He is a member of the Republican Party.

Early life and career
Buckel was born in Allegany County, Maryland on November 3, 1971. He graduated from Bishop Walsh School in Cumberland, Maryland and attended George Mason University, where he earned a B.A. degree in political science with honors, and the University of Maryland School of Law, where he earned a J.D. degree with honors. He was admitted to the Maryland Bar in 1996. After graduating, he started his own law firm and became a member of the Maryland State Bar Association.

Buckel became involved with politics in 2006, when he became a member of the Maryland Republican Party. In 2012, Buckel led the Allegany County campaign for Alex Mooney's exploratory bid in Maryland's 6th congressional district. In February 2014, he filed to run for the Maryland House of Delegates, seeking to unseat incumbent Delegate Kevin Kelly. He defeated Kelly in the general election, receiving 58.9 percent of the vote.

In December 2021, harassment charges were filed against Buckel in relation to his pending divorce. The complaint detailed more than three dozen messages sent by Buckel through Facebook Messenger to a Maryland State Police trooper who had a relationship with his estranged wife, including more than a half-dozen messages that had Buckel threatening to take his job and pension and to "destroy" and "bury" him. These charges were dropped by Frederick County prosecutors the next day.

In the legislature
Buckel was sworn into the Maryland House of Delegates on January 14, 2015.  From 2017 to 2018, he served as the Chief Deputy Minority Whip for the House Republican Caucus, and as the Minority Leader of the Maryland House of Delegates since April 2021.

In 2016, Buckel filed to run for delegate for the Republican National Convention, representing Marco Rubio. He received 1.8 percent of the vote in the primary election.

Committee assignments
 Member, Ways and Means Committee, 2015–present (election law subcommittee, 2015–2017; finance resources subcommittee, 2015–2019; revenues subcommittee, 2017–present; racing & gaming subcommittee, 2020–present)
 Joint Committee on Administrative, Executive and Legislative Review, 2019–present
 Rules and Executive Nominations Committee, 2021–present
 Legislative Policy Committee, 2021–present
 Joint Committee on Children, Youth, and Families, 2021–present
 Spending Affordability Committee, 2021–present
 Legislative Redistricting Advisory Commission, 2021–present
 Consent Calendars Committee, 2021–present
 House Cannabis Referendum and Legalization Work Group, 2021–present
 Member, Tax Credit Evaluation Committee, 2017–2021
 Work Group to Address Police Reform and Accountability in Maryland, 2020

Other memberships
 House Chair, Allegany County Delegation, 2016–present
 Member, Maryland Legislative Sportsmen's Caucus, 2014–present

West Virginia annexation letter
In October 2021, he was one of five Maryland state legislators from Garrett, Allegany and Washington counties who sent a pair of letters to West Virginia officials asking about annexation of Western Maryland to West Virginia. These letters caused a local uproar, with Allegany County officials calling the request a political stunt, an embarrassment and unneeded distraction. Following criticism from local officials and some constituents, Buckel and State Senator George Edwards issued a letter withdrawing support for the secession proposal.

Political positions

Elections
Buckel opposed legislation introduced during the 2022 legislative session that banned regulated lobbyists from contributing from their personal funds to a candidate with the intent of influencing action from the candidate, questioning the bill's constitutionality amid the Supreme Court's Citizens United v. FEC decision.

Energy
Buckel disagreed with Governor Larry Hogan's decision to support a ban on fracking in Maryland, saying that it would have brought jobs to Allegany and Garrett counties.

Guns
Buckel does not support gun control regulations, saying that the government "does not have a right" to regulate firearms.

In March 2022, during a debate on a bill that would ban sales of ghost guns, Buckel introduced an amendment that would strengthen convictions for people convicted of firearm theft. The amendment was rejected on a vote of 50-80.

Immigration
Buckel opposed legislation introduced in the 2021 legislative session that prohibited state and local governments from providing records or data to Immigration and Customs Enforcement for the purpose of civil immigration enforcement.

Justice
Buckel introduced legislation in the 2015 legislative session that would block law clinics from fighting against Maryland state agencies in court. The bill received an unfavorable report from the House Appropriations Committee.

Buckel opposed legislation introduced during the 2021 legislative session that would remove the Governor of Maryland from the parole process for people serving life sentences. The Maryland General Assembly voted to override Governor Hogan's veto on the bill during its special legislative session on December 7, 2021. Buckel also opposed legislation that would prohibit life without parole sentences for juvenile offenders, and introduced an amendment during the debate on the bill that would have banned it from applying to past offenses. The amendment was rejected in a 52-83 vote.

Labor
Buckel opposes right-to-work laws, calling them "not necessary and not feasible." He also supports providing workers with prevailing wages on government projects.

Marijuana
Buckel opposes legalizing marijuana, calling the move a "Pandora's box." He has also said that decriminalizing and legalizing the drug would pose many difficult questions for law enforcement, including how to test for marijuana intoxication of drivers. Buckel did not rule out voting to allow the use of medical marijuana under tight controls. He voted against legislation that would legalize recreational marijuana in the state if voters approved a constitutional amendment through a ballot referendum in 2022.

Redistricting
Buckel supports using single-member districts in the Maryland House of Delegates.

In August 2015, Buckel was appointed to the Maryland Redistricting Reform Commission by Governor Larry Hogan.

In July 2021, Buckel was appointed to the Maryland Legislative Redistricting Advisory Commission, which consisted of the leaders of each chamber of the Maryland General Assembly. He objected to the maps adopted by the commission over country splits. He later introduced an amendment that would switch the legislative redistricting panel's maps with those proposed by the Maryland Citizens Redistricting Commission. The amendment was rejected in a 43-93 vote. Buckel also opposed the legislative maps passed by the General Assembly in January 2022, saying that the legislative panel's map was drawn for partisan gain. He also opposed congressional maps passed by the General Assembly in March 2022.

Taxes
Buckel opposes introducing any new taxes, but supports the concept of bracketed local income tax as a way for counties to provide relief without losing too much revenue. During his 2014 campaign, he said that he would pursue a tax incentive program to bring cybersecurity and information technology to Allegany County. He also opposes increasing tobacco taxes, saying it would hurt local businesses by driving customers to West Virginia and Pennsylvania.

In April 2021, Buckel voted against legislation that would allow counties to set local income taxes at different rates for lower-income and wealthy residents.

In March 2022, Buckel voted against legislation that would extend a tax on health insurance companies, expressing concern that it results in higher premiums for people covered by group plans.

Transportation
Buckel supports restoring highway user funds, saying that much of the funding is now being used for mass transit projects in metropolitan areas.

Electoral history

References

External links

1971 births
21st-century American politicians
American Lutherans
George Mason University alumni
Living people
Republican Party members of the Maryland House of Delegates
People from Allegany County, Maryland
University of Maryland Francis King Carey School of Law alumni